George Arthur Henry Hoskins (16 October 1916 – 3 October 1995) was an Australian rules footballer who played with Fitzroy in the Victorian Football League (VFL) during the 1940s. He played in the midfield as a centreman.

References

External links

 

1916 births
Fitzroy Football Club players
Fitzroy Football Club Premiership players
Australian rules footballers from Victoria (Australia)
1995 deaths
One-time VFL/AFL Premiership players